Kuzhikandom is a small village in the Idukki district of Kerala, India.  The population is approximately 2,000, with 99% dependent on farming.

The village is known for its production of cardamom, pepper, jackfruit, coffee, tea, and vanilla.

References

Villages in Idukki district